Eulepidotis dives is a moth of the family Erebidae first described by Arthur Gardiner Butler in 1879. It is found in the Neotropics, including the Brazilian state of Amazonas.

References

Moths described in 1879
dives